Reticulitermes banyulensis is a species of termite of the family Rhinotermitidae found in the Roussillon region in France.

References 

Termites
Insects described in 1978
Insects of Europe